This was a new event in the ITF Women's Circuit in 2015.

Jamie Loeb and Sanaz Marand won the title, defeating Kaitlyn Christian and Danielle Lao in an all-American final, 6–3, 6–4.

Seeds

Draw

References 
 Draw

Stockton Challenger – Doubles